Rick Mueller (born December 4, 1967) is an American football executive who serves as the Director of Player Personnel for the Arlington Renegades of the XFL. He past served as the general manager of the Omaha Nighthawks of the United Football League in 2010-2011. He originally joined the league in 2009 as vice president and general manager, acting as the general manager for all four of the UFL's teams in the league's inaugural 2009 season. He was the director of pro personnel for the Philadelphia Eagles of the National Football League (NFL) from 2014 to 2015.

References

1967 births
Living people
Jacksonville Jaguars executives
New Orleans Saints executives
Omaha Nighthawks
Philadelphia Eagles executives
Puget Sound Loggers football players
Sacramento Surge coaches
United Football League (2009–2012) executives
Washington State Cougars football coaches
Players of American football from Spokane, Washington